Alfonso Fidalgo is a paralympic athlete from Spain competing mainly in category F11 shot and discus events.

Biography
Alfonso competed in three Paralympics, his first being in 1992 in his home country.  There he competed in  the B1 discus and shot winning gold in both.  He repeated this performance in Atlanta in 1996 where he also competed in the pentathlon but finished outside the medals.  The 2000 Summer Paralympics gave Alfonso his third consecutive gold medal in the discus but he was beaten in to silver by compatriot David Casinos

References

Paralympic athletes of Spain
Athletes (track and field) at the 1992 Summer Paralympics
Athletes (track and field) at the 1996 Summer Paralympics
Athletes (track and field) at the 2000 Summer Paralympics
Paralympic gold medalists for Spain
Paralympic silver medalists for Spain
Living people
Paralympic athletes with a vision impairment
Medalists at the 1992 Summer Paralympics
Medalists at the 1996 Summer Paralympics
Medalists at the 2000 Summer Paralympics
Year of birth missing (living people)
Paralympic medalists in athletics (track and field)
Spanish male discus throwers
Spanish male shot putters
Visually impaired discus throwers
Visually impaired shot putters
Paralympic discus throwers
Paralympic shot putters
Spanish blind people